Adam Carson (unknown - 1935) was a Scottish footballer who played as a forward. He played for Glasgow Thistle, Newton Heath, Ardwick and Liverpool during the 1890s. At representative level, he played once for the Scottish Football Alliance XI against the rival Scottish Football League in 1892.

References

External links
Profile at StretfordEnd.co.uk
Profile at MUFCInfo.com

Scottish footballers
Manchester United F.C. players
Manchester City F.C. players
Liverpool F.C. players
Thistle F.C. players
Year of birth missing
1935 deaths
Association football forwards